Nina Karin Stapelfeldt (born 13 April 1995) is a Swiss professional footballer who plays as a forward for Italian Serie A club FC Como and the Switzerland national team.

International career
Stapelfeldt made her debut for the Switzerland national team on 29 May 2019, as a substitute for Marilena Widmer in a 3–1 friendly defeat by Italy in Ferrara.

References

External links

Profile at the A.C. Milan website
Profile at the Swiss Football Association 
Profile at Footofeminin.fr 

1995 births
Living people
Women's association football forwards
Swiss women's footballers
Switzerland women's international footballers
Sportspeople from the canton of Zug
FC Luzern Frauen players
Swiss Women's Super League players
FC Zürich Frauen players
Swiss expatriate women's footballers
Expatriate women's footballers in the Netherlands
Swiss expatriate sportspeople in the Netherlands
Expatriate women's footballers in Belgium
Swiss expatriate sportspeople in Belgium
Expatriate women's footballers in France
Swiss expatriate sportspeople in France
Expatriate women's footballers in Italy
Swiss expatriate sportspeople in Italy
K.A.A. Gent (women) players
Super League Vrouwenvoetbal players
Eredivisie (women) players
FC Twente (women) players
Serie A (women's football) players
A.C. Milan Women players
ASJ Soyaux-Charente players
Division 1 Féminine players
S.S.D. F.C. Como Women players